American Beauty is a four-song EP by Bruce Springsteen that was released on limited edition (7,500 copies) 12-inch vinyl exclusively for Record Store Day on April 19, 2014. A digital download version was also released on April 22, 2014. The four songs that appeared on the EP are outtakes from Springsteen's 2014 album High Hopes. Springsteen said of the four songs, "they're just good music that didn't get onto this record, and was sitting there. I thought it's a nice time to support the record stores, which are dwindling and get some new music out at the same time."

On April 22, 2014, Springsteen released a music video for the song "American Beauty" which was shot prior to his show on April 19, 2014, in Charlotte, North Carolina.

Background
Springsteen had around 20 songs recorded during the High Hopes sessions that failed to make the final cut. Springsteen decided to go back with producer Ron Aniello and work on the music so they could give it a proper release. The EP's title track, "American Beauty", is a song left over from the demo tracks Springsteen didn't end up recording with producer Brendan O'Brien. Springsteen describes the song as "Exile meets E Street" and as being a song where he sings in a range he often doesn't visit. "Hurry Up Sundown", "a fun piece of modern power pop" according to Springsteen, was another demo track originally recorded with O'Brien. It was the closest of the four songs to making the High Hopes album. "Mary Mary" and "Hey Blue Eyes" were recorded during the Magic and Working on a Dream sessions, respectively. Springsteen said of "Mary Mary" that the song is "a lovely mystery, a small piece of heartbreak poetry that sneaks up on you with its slippery groove, punctuated string section and spectral lyrics". "Hey Blue Eyes" is one of Springsteen's darkest political songs. "Written during the Bush years, it’s a metaphor for the house of horrors our government’s actions created in the years following the invasion of Iraq. At its center is the repressed sexuality and abuse of power that characterized Abu Ghraib prison. I feel this is a shadow we as a country have yet to emerge from." Springsteen said. Tom Morello, who is featured prominently on High Hopes and its supporting tour with Springsteen, plans on covering "Hey Blue Eyes" for an upcoming project.

Track listing

Personnel
Bruce Springsteen – lead vocals , background vocals , 6-string acoustic guitar , 12-string acoustic guitar , electric guitar , slide guitar , bass , keyboards , synth , pump organ , piano , organ , tambourine , percussion , glockenspiel 
Roy Bittan – piano 
Nils Lofgren – guitar , pedal steel guitar 
Patti Scialfa – background vocals 
Garry Tallent – bass 
Max Weinberg – drums 
 Charles Giordano – organ , farfisa organ 
 Soozie Tyrell – fiddle 
 Ron Aniello – bass , additional piano , synth 
 Josh Freese – drums , timpani 
 Songa Lee  – violin 
 Steve Richards  – cello 
 Toby Scott  – drum programming 
 Scott Tibbs  – string arrangement and conductor 
 Patrick Warren  – keyboards 

Technical
 Ron Aniello, Bruce Springsteen – production 
 Brendan O'Brien – production 
 Rob Lebret, Ross Petersen, Toby Scott – engineering 
 Dave Schiffman – drums engineering , strings engineering 
 Brendan DeKora – assistant
 Nick DiDia – engineering 
 Tom Tapley – assistant 
 Chris Lord-Alge – mixing 
 Andrew Schubert, Brad Townsend, Keith Armstrong, Nik Karpen – assistants
 Bob Clearmountain – mixing 
 Sergio Ruelas Jr. – assistant
 Brendan O'Brien – mixing 
 Nick DiDia, Tom Tapley – assistants
 Bob Ludwig – mastering
 Chris Bellman – vinyl cutting engineer
 Toby Scott – production coordination
 Shari Sutcliffe – musician contractor
 Kevin Buell – guitars and technical services
 Michelle Holme – art direction, design

Chart performance

References

Bruce Springsteen EPs
2014 EPs
Albums produced by Ron Aniello
Columbia Records EPs
Record Store Day releases
Albums produced by Toby Scott